Joseph Michael Forshaw is an Australian ornithologist, and expert on parrots. He was the former head of wildlife conservation for the Australian National Parks and Wildlife Service.

Bibliography

References

Australian ornithologists
Living people
Year of birth missing (living people)